Estadio Monterrey may refer to:

Estadio BBVA, a soccer stadium in Guadalupe, Nuevo León, Mexico
Estadio de Béisbol Monterrey, a baseball stadium in Monterrey, Mexico